Crematogaster constructor is a species of ant in tribe Crematogastrini. It was described by Emery in 1895.

References

constructor
Insects described in 1895